A Rak'ah is a single iteration of prescribed movements and supplications performed by Muslims as part of the prescribed obligatory prayer known as salah. Each of the five daily prayers observed by Muslims consists of a number of raka'at.

Procedure
After washing for prayer by performing the ritual ablution, a believer must renew their innermost intention, thus purifying their prayer for the sake of Allah. An intention Niyyah is not to be said verbally but rather it is made in the heart; but can also be said verbally alongside the intention in the heart. Example: you intended in your heart to pray 4 Units (Rakahs) for you start your prayer.

The raka'ah begins when the worshipper initiates the salah with the words "Allah is The Greatest", (Allah-hu-Akbar) this is known in Arabic as the Takbir. Takbir must be said at the start of the Salah or the prayer is invalidated. The individual will observe the standing position while reciting the   "Dua al istiftah" followed by the opening chapter of the Qur'an (Al-Fatiha) (Note: reciting the Al-Fatiha is a pillar of prayer. If one forgets to say the Al-Fatiha or makes a major mistake in its Tajweed, then they must redo the prayer from the start) followed by a personal selection of chosen verses or chapters which the worshippers are free to choose to recite for themselves.

The second part of the raka'ah involves the worshipper making another Takbir then bowing to a 90 degree angle, placing their hands on their knees with their feet kept shoulder-width apart, eyes are meant to be focused in between you feet or around the area and bowing in humble submission as if awaiting God's command. During this position the words, "Glory be to Allah the most magnificent" are uttered silently as a form of ritual praise.

The third movement of the raka'ah is to return from bowing to the standing position before, with the praise of Allah on your tongue, descending into full prostration on the ground.

In prostration, the worshipper's forehead and nose is flatly placed on the floor with the palm of their hands placed shoulder-width apart to the right and left of their ears. While going in the "sujood" or the prostration position, one must remember that first, the knees should touch the ground, then his hands, then his nose and at last his forehead. The worshipper's elbows, forearms and chest are then raised off the floor.

During this position the words, "Glory be to Allah the Almighty" are repeated with contemplation as a form of ritual praise. The Islamic prophet Muhammad taught his disciples that "the closest a subject gets to God is when in prostration".

The fourth movement is for the worshipper to return from prostration into a sitting position with their legs folded flatly under their body. While getting up from the prostration, one must follow the order opposite to the order followed while going into the prostration i.e. he should first raise his forehead, then his nose, then his hands and at last his knees. In this position they would invoke Allah for forgiveness of your sins and the sins of their parents and the wider believers before descending into a second prostration.

This concludes one unit of prayer known in Arabic as a raka'ah and would be followed by either standing up for a second raka'ah if the prayer requires it or by proceeding to end the salah with taslim.

Although not part of a single raka'ah, the conclusion of the salah takes place in the sitting position, the worshipper turns their head to the right saying, "Peace be unto you, and Allah's mercy and blessing" before subsequently turning the head to the left and repeating the salutation. This action helps to reminds Muslims of the presence of the recording angels on their right and left who record their deeds.

Components
 Takbir
 Standing in salah
 Supplications or iftitah 
 Recitation of Sura Al-Fatiha
 Recitation of another sura
 Ruku (bowing)
 Straightening up from ruku
 Sujud (prostration)
 Rising from sujud
 The second sujud
 Sitting in prayers
 Salam (salutation)

Daily prayers
Islamic daily prayers are performed in the following numbers of Rak'at :

Fajr — The Dawn prayer:  2 Rak'at Sunnah (Muakkadah) + 2 Rakat Fard, total 4
 ðuhr — The Midday or Afternoon Prayer: 4 Rakat Sunnat (Muakkadah) + 4 Rakat Fard + 2 Rakat Sunnah (Muakkadah) followed by 2 Rakat Nafl, total 12
 As'r — The Evening Prayer: 4 Rakat Sunnah (Ghair Muakkadah) + 4 Rakat Fard, total 8
 Maghrib — The Dusk Prayer: 3 Rakat Fard + 2 Rakat Sunnah (Muakkadah) + 2 Nafl Rakat, total 7
 Isha — The Night Prayer: 4 Rakat Sunnah (Ghair Muakkadah) + 4 Rakat Fard + 2 Rakat Sunnah (Muakkadah) + 2 Rakat Nafl + 3 Rakat Witr Waajib + 2 Rakat Nafl, total 17

Regarding Jumu'ah (Friday) Prayer. obligatory only upon healthy men, optional for the women and they can choose to pray Zuhr at home instead. It consists of 2 Rakat after the Arabic Khutbah and followed by 4 or 2 Rakat Sunnah(Muakkadah) after the 2 Fard Rakat. So it's either 2 Rakat or four Rakat.
There are two Eid prayers in a year, Eid-ul-fitr and Eid-ul-adha.

See also 
Dhikr
Tasbih
Sign prayer

Notes

Endnotes

References

Salah
Arabic words and phrases
Salah terminology